The 2008 West Coast Conference men's basketball tournament took place March 7–10, 2008. The first round was held in San Diego, California at the Jenny Craig Pavilion. The semifinals were televised by ESPN2. The West Coast Conference Championship Game was televised by ESPN.

2008 West Coast Conference tournament

References

External links
2008 Tournament Bracket

Tournament
West Coast Athletic Conference men's basketball tournament
West Coast Athletic Conference men's basketball tournament
West Coast Conference men's basketball tournament
Sports competitions in San Diego
Basketball in San Diego
College sports tournaments in California